Demirel Veladžić (born 15 May 1999) is a Bosnian professional footballer who plays as a midfielder.

Career
Before the second half of the 2017–18 season, Veladžić joined the youth academy of Portuguese second division side Leixões from Sarajevo, one of Bosnia and Herzegovina's most successful club.

On 15 June 2020, he joined Bosnian Premier League club Mladost Doboj Kakanj.

References

External links

1999 births
Living people
People from Velika Kladuša
Bosnia and Herzegovina footballers
Bosnia and Herzegovina youth international footballers
Association football midfielders
FK Sarajevo players
FK Mladost Doboj Kakanj players
Premier League of Bosnia and Herzegovina players
Bosnia and Herzegovina expatriate footballers
Bosnia and Herzegovina expatriate sportspeople in Portugal
Expatriate footballers in Portugal